Luis Miguel Mansilla Almonacid (born 26 July 1986, Puerto Natales, died 10 May 2021) was a Chilean track and road cyclist. At the 2012 Summer Olympics, he competed in the omnium.

Major results
2006
 1st Stages 4b & 5 Vuelta de Chile
2009
 3rd Overall Tour do Rio
1st Stage 3 
2010
 1st Stage 6 Tour de San Juan
2011
 1st Stages 1 (TTT), 3 & 5 Vuelta de Chile
 7th Time trial, Pan American Road Championships
 10th Overall Tour de San Luis
2012
 1st Stages 1 (TTT), 3 & 6 Vuelta de Chile
 7th Overall Tour de San Luis

References

External links

Chilean male cyclists
Living people
Olympic cyclists of Chile
Cyclists at the 2012 Summer Olympics
Chilean track cyclists
1986 births
People from Puerto Natales
Pan American Games silver medalists for Chile
Pan American Games medalists in cycling
Cyclists at the 2011 Pan American Games
Medalists at the 2011 Pan American Games
20th-century Chilean people
21st-century Chilean people